Shiv Dayal Batish (better known as S.D. Batish; 14 December 1914 – 29 July 2006) was an Indian singer and music director born in Patiala, India. He died in Santa Cruz, California, USA where he had lived since 1970.

Career
Shiv was a composer, playback singer and music director for Bollywood music. He broadcast his first radio program in 1936, from the studios of All India Radio, Delhi. He scored music for a number of early Bollywood movies such as Betab, Bahu Beti, Karwat 1949,Naata 1955,Toofan, Haar jeet 1954, Tipu Sultan 1959, Hum Bhi Kuch Kam Nahin, Amar Keertan, and Zalim Tera Jawab Naheen.

Shiv moved to the United Kingdom in 1964. While playing at a festival in Wales, Cardiff, he impressed Lord Fenner Brockway, who then helped him immigrate to the UK.

He recorded a number of songs for the BBC where he became a regular radio and television artist. He wrote the lyrics, composed the music, and sang the theme song "Nai Zindagi Naya Jeevan" ("New Birth, New Life") to the BBC television show Apna Hi Ghar Samajhiye ("Make Yourself at Home"), a cornerstone of early South Asian programming. He had the honor of being the first musician to feature when the Asian programs in Britain started back in 1965.

In early 1965, Batish played vichitra veena on the incidental music used in the Beatles' feature film Help! Batish subsequently gave dilruba lessons to Pattie Boyd, the wife of Beatles guitarist George Harrison, whose dedication to Indian classical music had helped popularise the genre in the West during the mid 1960s.

In 1970 he moved to the USA to teach music at the University of California, Santa Cruz. He and his son Ashwin Batish formed the Batish Institute of Indian music and Fine Arts.

Books

 Ragopedia, V. 1 - Exotic Scales of North India (Book)
 Ragopedia Cassette - Accompaniment tape to Ragopedia V. 1 (Book)
 Ragopedia V. 2, Exotic Scales of South India (Book)
 First 10 Thaat Raga Chalans - (Text and Cassettes package)
 Raga Chalans V. 1 (A-C) - Expansions for all the ragas from A to C as given in the Ragopedia V. 1 (Book)
 Raga Chalans V. 2 (D-I) - Expansions for all the ragas from D to I as given in the Ragopedia V. 1 (Book)
 Raga Chalans V. 3 (J-K) - Expansions for all the ragas from J to K as given in the Ragopedia V. 1 (Book)
 Raga Chalans V. 4 (L-M) - Expansions for all the ragas from L to M as given in the Ragopedia V. 1 (Book)
 Raga Chalans V. 5 (N-R) - Expansions for all the ragas from N to R as given in the Ragopedia V. 1 (Book)
 Raga Chalans V. 6 (S) - Expansions for all the ragas under S as given in the Ragopedia V. 1 (Book)
 Raga Chalans V. 7 (T-Y plus some rare ragas) - Expansions for all the ragas from T to Y plus a collection of rare ragas not previously listed in the Ragopedia V. 1 (Book)
 Rasik Raga Lakshan Manjari V. 1 - History and Theory of North Indian Music with Lakshan Geets (introductory songs written in English) for the First Ten Thaats of the North Indian classical music system written in staff and sargam notations. (Book)
 First Ten Thaat Raga Lakshan Geet - Written, composed and sung by S. D. Batish (Cassette / CD)
 Rasik Raga Lakshan Manjari V. 2 - 100 further Lakshan Geet, 10 per Thaat written in staff and sargam notations. (Book)

Audio CDs

 Om Shanti Meditation - Dilruba (Cassette/CD)
 Ram Bhajans - Hindu Devotional Songs (Cassette/CD)
 72 Carnatic Melakarta of South India - volume 1 (Cassette/CD)
 Raga Todi - Alaap and Bhajan "Jai Jia Mahadeva" (Cassette/CD)
 Asavari Thaat Ragas Lakshan Geet (Cassette/CD)
 Bhairava Thaat Raga Lakshan Geet (Cassette/CD)
 Bhairavi Thaat Raga Lakshan Geet (Cassette/CD)
 Bilaval Thaat Raga Lakshan Geet (Cassette/CD)
 Kafi Thaat Raga Lakshan Geet (Cassette/CD)
 Kalyan Thaat Raga Lakshan Geet (Cassette/CD)
 Khammaj Thaat Raga Lakshan Geet(Cassette/CD)
 Marava Thaat Raga Lakshan Geet (Cassette/CD)
 Pooravi Thaat Raga Lakshan Geet(Cassette/CD)
 Todi Thaat Raga Lakshan Geet (Cassette/CD)

Notes

External links
 S D Batish - Personal Website Link
 Batish on India's SaReGaMa Label of HMV

1914 births
2006 deaths
Indian film score composers
Bollywood playback singers
Music directors
Indian male playback singers
20th-century Indian singers
People from Patiala district
Singers from Punjab, India
Indian male film score composers
20th-century Indian male singers
Indian emigrants to the United States